Pavel Viktorovich Nazimov (born 4 February 1996) is a Russian football player who plays for JIPPO in Finland.

Club career
He made his professional debut in the Russian Professional Football League for FC Zenit-2 St. Petersburg on 18 July 2014 in a game against FC Kolomna.

References

External links

1996 births
Living people
Russian footballers
Russian expatriate footballers
Association football forwards
FC Zenit Saint Petersburg players
FC Zenit-2 Saint Petersburg players
FC Lahti players
FC Dynamo Stavropol players
JIPPO players
Russian Second League players
Russian First League players
Veikkausliiga players
Russian expatriate sportspeople in Finland
Expatriate footballers in Finland